Simonstown Gaels GAA is a Gaelic Athletic Association club based in the town of Navan, in County Meath, Ireland. The club mainly plays Gaelic football. In 2003 and 2004 the team reached the Meath Senior Football Championship final. The Simonstown club also has ladies' teams from academy to senior level.

Football titles
Meath Senior Football Championship Winners (2)
 2016 2017
Meath Senior Football Championship Finalists: 2
2003, 2004
 Meath Intermediate Football Championship Winners (1)
 1995
 Meath Junior Football Championship (1)
 1990

References

External links

Gaelic games clubs in County Meath